Patrick Donald Edward Rowe (born February 17, 1969) is a former American football wide receiver who played one season with the Cleveland Browns of the National Football League (NFL). He was drafted by the Browns in the second round of the 1992 NFL Draft. He played college football at San Diego State University and attended Lincoln High School in San Diego, California.

See also
 List of NCAA major college football yearly receiving leaders

References

External links
Just Sports Stats
College stats

Living people
1969 births
Players of American football from San Diego
American football wide receivers
African-American players of American football
San Diego State Aztecs football players
Cleveland Browns players
21st-century African-American people
20th-century African-American sportspeople
Ed Block Courage Award recipients